Yvias (Gallo: Ivinyac) is a commune in the Côtes-d'Armor department in Brittany in northwestern France.

Population

Inhabitants of Yvias are called yviasais in French.

Nearest cities and towns 

 Lanleff, 3 km
 Plourivo, 3.8 km
 Pléhédel, 5 km
 Kerfot, 5.3 km
 Quemper-Guézennec, 5.6 km
 Tréméven, 7.6 km
 Plouézec, 8.4 km
 Paimpol, 8.4 km
 Le Faouët, 9.1 kmm
 Lanloup, 9.2 km
 Pludual, 9,4 km

See also
Communes of the Côtes-d'Armor department

References

External links

Communes of Côtes-d'Armor